The Sutton Place is a luxury hotel in the Canadian city of Vancouver, British Columbia. The hotel is owned by Northland Properties and managed by the Sutton Place Hotel Company (SP) (which also managed the Sutton Place Hotel in Toronto).

Description
The hotel is one of Canada's two five-diamond hotels and made the 2004 Conde Nast Gold List of the best hotels in the world. It is said to attract "deep-pocketed business travellers and a galaxy of visiting film and TV stars."
The decor is mainly European-inspired, particularly French. Frommer's said of it "Don't let the big pink hospital-like exterior fool you. Once you enter the lobby of this centrally located hotel, it's pure luxury."

The hotel is served by the Restaurant Boulevard Kitchen & Oyster Bar.

References

External links
Official website

Year of establishment missing
Hotels in Vancouver
Northland Properties